Steelstown Brian Óg's GAC is a Gaelic Athletic Association club based in Derry, Northern Ireland. The club is a member of the Derry GAA and currently cater for Gaelic football and Ladies' Gaelic football.

The club's catchment area includes Steelstown and the wider Shantallow area at the edge of the city. Steelstown are one of the most successful Gaelic teams in the Cityside of Derry, with most of the county's footballers coming from rural areas. Underage teams up to U-12's play in North Derry GAA league and championships; from U-14 upwards teams compete in All-Derry competitions. The club play their home games at Páirc Bríd.

Gaelic football
Steelstown fields Gaelic football teams at U8, U10, U12, U14, U16, Minor, Reserve, and Senior levels. They currently compete in the Derry Senior Championship and Division 1 of the Derry ACFL having won promotion for the first time in their short history in 2011.

Ladies' Gaelic football
The club also field Ladies' football teams at various age-groups. The senior ladies won county Junior B title in 2012. The minor ladies also won their county championship in 2012.

History
Established in 1987, Steelstown GAC is one of the youngest clubs in the county. The founding members were mostly people from rural areas of the county who had moved to the city. They included twice All Star Anthony McGurk from Lavey, his wife Mary, Philip and Marion Devlin from Drumsurn and Mickey Doherty from Claudy. The first team was an U-12 team and they were actually called Steelstown/Pennyburn, because they drew players from the two schools, and played at Templemore Sports Complex. The club gained access to the North Derry Board in 1996 and a Senior team was formed for the first time. With the recent explosion of popularity of Gaelic games in Derry City, the club has gained a lot of members since the mid-1990s and Steelstown is probably making the best upwards strides of any club in the city. In recent years Steelstown have had numerous players represent Derry at Senior, U21 and Minor level.

Paul O'Hea and Marty Dunne were part of Derry's 2002 All-Ireland Minor Football Championship winning side, and in 2007, O'Hea became the first Steelstown player to play for Derry in the All-Ireland Championship when he came on as a sub against Mayo in Celtic Park. 15 Steelstown players were part of the St Columb's team that won the McLarnon Cup in 2002. Stephen Cleary, Neil Forrester, Mickey McKinney all from the club were part of Derry's 2007 All-Ireland Minor Championship runners-up team. Martin Dunne was part of Damien Cassidy's 2010 intercounty squad and made a number of appearances in the NFL.

In 2003, the club's new home pitch was opened on the Ballyarnet Road. A new £600,000 development of club rooms and changing facilities was completed at Páirc Brid, and was opened in March 2007. Pairc Brid is the home of Steelstown Brian Óg's GAC. It is named after former Chairperson, the late Brid Kelly-McElroy who taught in Pennburn Primary school and was hugely influential in the formative years of Steelstown in the 1990s. Opened in 2003, Pairc Bhird is a "Prunty Pitch", with clubhouse facilities including 4 changing rooms, meeting room and sports hall.
 by then GAA president, Sean Kelly. The facilities have helped continue the growth of the club at all age levels. In 2005 Steelstown lost out to Glen Thirds in the final of the Derry Junior Football Championship, however the Seniors achieved promotion to Intermediate Football. Around this time the club also started a ladies' team. In 2008, Steelstown claimed their first ever senior title by defeating Limavady in the Dr Kerlin Cup final in Claudy with unsung hero Conán Doherty leaping to fame with a heroic left footed effort to the back of the net. In 2008 young Steelstown star Brian Óg Mckeever was diagnosed with cancer, later died of it. Brian Óg represented Derry under 15's and under 16's and was called into the minor team before having to pull out due to illness. He captained the Steelstown teams up to minor level. Brian Óg had a huge influence upon every one who knew him. Steelstown decided to rename the club in honour of the committed footballer to Steelstown Brian Óg's GAC. Steelstown also retired the number 5 jersey in his honour.

In 2010, Steelstown were runners up to Castledawson in the Intermediate Championship final, losing out by a late point on the scoreline of 0–10 to 0–11.

Having finished top of Division 2, Steelstown lost to Craigbane in the 2011 league final by 3 points. With one final chance against Division 1 relegation candidates, Newbridge, Steelstown booked their place in Derry's top flight as the first city side to do so in over 30 years. An injury time wonder goal, courtesy of Stephen Cleary's left boot, was the eventual margin as Brian Óg's secured senior status for the first time.

Honours

Senior
 All-Ireland Intermediate Club Football Championship: 1
 2021–22
 Ulster Intermediate Club Football Championship: 1  
2021
Derry Intermediate Football Championship: 1
2021 
Dr Kerlin Cup (North Derry 13-a-Side) 1
2008

Senior Reserves
 Intermediate Football Championship Winners 3
 2016, 2018, 2020
 Intermediate Football League 1
 2011

Ladies
Derry Senior Football Championship 3
2020, 2021, 2022
Derry Intermediate Football Championship 1
2016
Ulster Junior Championship 1
2016
Junior B Championship 1
2012 
Minor County championship 1
2012
Minor League title 1
2012
 Under 16 county shield 1
2011

Minor
Tommy O'Neill Cup (Derry Minor 'A' Football Championship) 1
2005
North Derry Minor 'A' Football Championship: 1
2005

Under-16
 North Derry Under-16 Football Championship: 1
 2005
 North Derry Under-16 'B' Football Championship: 2
 2003, 2014

Under-14
 North Derry Under-14 Football Championship: 1
 2003
 County Derry Under-14 Football A League: 1
 2014

Note: The above lists may be incomplete. Please add any other honours you know of.

See also
Derry Intermediate Football Championship
List of Gaelic games clubs in Derry

External links
Steelstown GAC Website

References

Gaelic games clubs in County Londonderry
Gaelic football clubs in County Londonderry
1987 establishments in Northern Ireland